is a Japanese weightlifter. He competed in the men's flyweight event at the 1972 Summer Olympics.

References

1947 births
Living people
Japanese male weightlifters
Olympic weightlifters of Japan
Weightlifters at the 1972 Summer Olympics
Place of birth missing (living people)